is a Japanese mixed martial artist competing in the flyweight division. Urushitani held the Shooto bantamweight championship from 2010 to 2012 before vacating it to sign with the UFC. He was among the first flyweight fighters to fight in the UFC, Urushitani is currently signed to One Fighting Championship.

Mixed martial arts career

Early career in Japan
Urushitani made his professional MMA debut for the Shooto promotion in January 2001 in his native Japan.  Over the next decade, he amassed a record of 19 wins, 4 losses and 6 draws.

Urushitani competed for the Shooto Bantamweight (125 lbs; Flyweight in the United States) championship in 2003 and 2007, but lost both championship fights due to a decision and a draw, respectively.  He eventually fought for the belt a third time, facing Ryuichi Miki in May 2010. He won the title via decision.

Ultimate Fighting Championship
Urushitani signed with the UFC to compete in a tournament to crown the newly minted UFC Flyweight Championship.

Urushitani faced Joseph Benavidez on March 3, 2012 at UFC on FX 2 in the semi-finals of the tournament.  He lost the fight via TKO in the second round.

Urushitani was expected to face John Lineker on September 1, 2012 at UFC 151. However, after UFC 151 was cancelled, Urushitani/Lineker was rescheduled and took place on November 10, 2012 at UFC on Fuel TV 6. Urushitani lost the bout via unanimous decision. Urishitani was then released from the promotion.

ONE Fighting Championship
After Urushitani  got released from the UFC he was signed by ONE FC.  He debuted on their May 31, 2013 card ONE FC 9: Rise to Power against Rey Docyogen.  He won the fight via split decision.

After two consecutive wins, Urushitani faced Brazilian Adriano Moraes at One FC 14: War of Nations. After winning the first round, Urushitani was taken down and submitted in the second round by rear naked choke.

Championships and accomplishments

Mixed martial arts
Shooto
Shooto Bantamweight Championship (One time; Vacated)

Mixed martial arts record

|-
| Loss
| align=center| 21–8–6
| Takumi Tamaru
| Submission (armbar)
| Shooto: Pacific Rim Double Championship
| 
| align=center| 1
| align=center| 4:48
| Tokyo, Japan
|
|-
| Loss
| align=center| 21–7–6
| Adriano Moraes
| Submission (rear-naked choke)
| ONE FC: War of Nations
| 
| align=center| 2
| align=center| 3:48
| Kuala Lumpur, Malaysia
| 
|-
| Win
| align=center| 21–6–6
| Jae Nam Yoo
| Decision (unanimous)
| Deep: Tribe Tokyo Fight
| 
| align=center| 3
| align=center| 5:00
| Tokyo, Japan
| 
|-
| Win
| align=center| 20–6–6
| Rey Docyogen
| Decision (split)
| ONE FC: Rise to Power
| 
| align=center| 3
| align=center| 5:00
| Pasay, Philippines
| 
|-
| Loss
| align=center| 19–6–6
| John Lineker
| Decision (unanimous)
| UFC on Fuel TV: Franklin vs. Le
| 
| align=center| 3
| align=center| 5:00
| Macau, SAR, China
| 
|-
| Loss
| align=center| 19–5–6
| Joseph Benavidez
| TKO (punches)
| UFC on FX: Alves vs. Kampmann
| 
| align=center| 2
| align=center| 0:11
| Sydney, Australia
| 
|-
| Win
| align=center| 19–4–6
| Yuki Shoujou
| TKO (head kick and punches)
| Shooto: Shootor's Legacy 3
| 
| align=center| 2
| align=center| 0:24
| Tokyo, Japan
| 
|-
| Win
| align=center| 18–4–6
| Takuya Mori
| TKO (punches)
| Shooto: The Way of Shooto 6: Like a Tiger, Like a Dragon
| 
| align=center| 1
| align=center| 4:49
| Tokyo, Japan
| 
|-
| Win
| align=center| 17–4–6
| Ryuichi Miki
| Decision (unanimous)
| Shooto: The Way of Shooto 3: Like a Tiger, Like a Dragon
| 
| align=center| 3
| align=center| 5:00
| Tokyo, Japan
| 
|-
| Win
| align=center| 16–4–6
| Ryuichi Miki
| Decision (unanimous)
| Shooto: Revolutionary Exchanges 2
| 
| align=center| 3
| align=center| 5:00
| Tokyo, Japan
| 
|-
| Win
| align=center| 15–4–6
| Kiyotaka Shimizu
| TKO (doctor stoppage)
| Cage Force: EX Eastern Bound
| 
| align=center| 1
| align=center| 5:00
| Tokyo, Japan
| 
|-
|  Loss
| align=center| 14–4–6
| Yuki Shoujou
| Submission (guillotine choke)
| Shooto: Shooto Tradition 3
| 
| align=center| 3
| align=center| 3:39
| Tokyo, Japan
| 
|-
| Draw
| align=center| 14–3–6
| Ryuichi Miki
| Draw
| Shooto: Shooto Tradition 1
| 
| align=center| 3
| align=center| 5:00
| Tokyo, Japan
| 
|-
| Draw
| align=center| 14–3–5
| Jesse Taitano
| Draw
| GCM: Cage Force 5
| 
| align=center| 3
| align=center| 5:00
| Tokyo, Japan
| 
|-
|  Win
| align=center| 14–3–4
| Mamoru Yamaguchi
| Decision (unanimous)
| Shooto: Back To Our Roots 5
| 
| align=center| 3
| align=center| 5:00
| Tokyo, Japan
| 
|-
| Draw
| align=center| 13–3–4
| Shinichi Kojima
| Draw
| Shooto: Back To Our Roots 2
| 
| align=center| 3
| align=center| 5:00
| Tokyo, Japan
| 
|-
|  Win
| align=center| 13–3–3
| Junji Ikoma
| Decision (unanimous)
| Shooto: 11/10 in Korakuen Hall
| 
| align=center| 3
| align=center| 5:00
| Tokyo, Japan
| 
|-
| Win
| align=center| 12–3–3
| Daiji Takahashi
| Decision (unanimous)
| Shooto 2006: 9/8 in Korakuen Hall
| 
| align=center| 3
| align=center| 5:00
| Yokohama, Japan
| 
|-
| Win
| align=center| 11–3–3
| Daniel Lima
| Decision (unanimous)
| MARS World Grand Prix
| 
| align=center| 2
| align=center| 5:00
| Seoul, South Korea
| 
|-
| Draw
| align=center| 10–3–3
| Shinichi Kojima
| Draw
| Shooto: 9/23 in Korakuen Hall
| 
| align=center| 3
| align=center| 5:00
| Tokyo, Japan
| 
|-
| Win
| align=center| 10–3–2
| Lorenzo Coca
| KO (punch)
| GCM: D.O.G 1
| 
| align=center| 1
| align=center| 0:27
| Tokyo, Japan
| 
|-
| Win
| align=center| 9–3–2
| John Dodson
| Decision (unanimous)
| GCM: Demolition 041114
| 
| align=center| 2
| align=center| 5:00
| Tokyo, Japan
| 
|-
|  Loss
| align=center| 8–3–2
| Setsu Iguchi
| Decision (unanimous)
| GCM: Demolition 040919
| 
| align=center| 2
| align=center| 5:00
| Tokyo, Japan
| 
|-
| Win
| align=center| 8–2–2
| Junji Ikoma
| Decision (unanimous)
| Shooto: 7/16 in Korakuen Hall
| 
| align=center| 3
| align=center| 5:00
| Tokyo, Japan
| 
|-
|  Loss
| align=center| 7–2–2
| Mamoru Yamaguchi
| Decision (unanimous)
| Shooto: Year End Show 2003
| 
| align=center| 3
| align=center| 5:00
| Tokyo, Japan
| 
|-
| Win
| align=center| 7–1–2
| Robson Moura
| Decision (split)
| Shooto: 5/4 in Korakuen Hall
| 
| align=center| 3
| align=center| 5:00
| Tokyo, Japan
| 
|-
| Win
| align=center| 6–1–2
| Masatoshi Abe
| Decision (unanimous)
| Shooto: Treasure Hunt 11
| 
| align=center| 2
| align=center| 5:00
| Tokyo, Japan
| 
|-
| Win
| align=center| 5–1–2
| Tomohiro Hashi
| Decision (unanimous)
| Shooto: Gig East 10
| 
| align=center| 2
| align=center| 5:00
| Tokyo, Japan
| 
|-
| Win
| align=center| 4–1–2
| Yasuhiro Akagi
| Technical submission (kimura/triangle)
| Shooto: Treasure Hunt 6
| 
| align=center| 2
| align=center| 1:57
| Tokyo, Japan
| 
|-
| Win
| align=center| 3–1–2
| Masaru Gokita
| Decision (unanimous)
| Shooto: Treasure Hunt 4
| 
| align=center| 2
| align=center| 5:00
| Tokyo, Japan
| 
|-
| Draw
| align=center| 2–1–2
| Naoki Deguchi
| Draw
| GCM: The Contenders X-Rage 1
| 
| align=center| 2
| align=center| 5:00
| Tokyo, Japan
| 
|-
| Win
| align=center| 2–1–1
| Katsuhisa Akasaki
| Decision (majority)
| Shooto: To The Top 10
| 
| align=center| 2
| align=center| 5:00
| Tokyo, Japan
| 
|-
| Draw
| align=center| 1–1–1
| Atsunori Hiruma
| Decision (unanimous)
| GCM: Club Contenders 1
| 
| align=center| 2
| align=center| 3:00
| Tokyo, Japan
| 
|-
| Win
| align=center| 1–1
| Homare Kuboyama
| Decision (unanimous)
| Shooto: To The Top 3
| 
| align=center| 2
| align=center| 5:00
| Tokyo, Japan
| 
|-
| Loss
| align=center| 0–1
| Daiji Takahashi
| Decision (unanimous)
| Shooto: To The Top 1
| 
| align=center| 2
| align=center| 5:00
| Tokyo, Japan
|

References

External links

1976 births
Living people
Japanese male mixed martial artists
Flyweight mixed martial artists
Mixed martial artists utilizing Brazilian jiu-jitsu
Wajitsu Keishukai
Ultimate Fighting Championship male fighters
Sportspeople from Tokyo
Japanese practitioners of Brazilian jiu-jitsu